Ischnochiton maorianus, sometimes called the variable chiton, is a fast moving species of chiton in the family Ischnochitonidae, endemic to the main islands of New Zealand where it is abundant.

Description and habitat 

Medium-sized cigar-shaped chiton up to 50mm in length, dull brown or grey-green, in its northern range frequently mottled in colours ranging from blue to orange. Small grainy riblets cover the outer parts of the valves, the centers being smooth or eroded, a white streak often seen lengthways across the top. The girdle is narrow and may be irregularly banded in dark or light shades. Occurs in sheltered harbours or exposed coasts, from the high intertidal zone to 25m deep, often aggregating in large numbers around the edge of cobbles at the sediment line or just below it.

References 

 Powell A. W. B., New Zealand Mollusca, William Collins Publishers Ltd, Auckland, New Zealand 1979 

Ischnochitonidae
Chitons of New Zealand
Molluscs described in 1914